Testican-1 is a protein that in humans is encoded by the SPOCK1 gene.

This gene encodes the protein core of a seminal plasma proteoglycan containing chondroitin- and heparan-sulfate chains. The protein's function is under research, though it is from the same family of glycoproteins as SPARC. It is thought its similarity to thyropin-type cysteine protease inhibitors suggests its function may be related to protease inhibition.

References

Further reading

Testicans